Marion Center may refer to various communities in the United States:

Marion Center, Massachusetts
Marion Center, Pennsylvania